Stylianos "Stelios" Giannakopoulos (born 12 July 1974), popularly known as Stelios, is a Greek football manager and former player. During his playing career, Giannakopoulos played as a right winger or attacking midfielder and was one of the best known Greek footballers internationally, due to his successful spells with Olympiacos and Bolton Wanderers as well as his appearances with the 2004 European championship-winning Greece national football team.

Club career

Early career
Born in Athens, Stelios is the second son of Alekos, a former football player who played during the 1960's. He joined Ethnikos Asteras (the semi-professional club of his neighbourhood Kaisariani) when he was seven years old, later moved for one year to Doxa Vyronas, and finally made his first-team debut for Ethnikos Asteras in the autumn of 1991, in a season which ended with the club gaining promotion to the professional Third Division. Next year, in his opening season as a professional, the young striker found himself scoring six goals and impressing the scouters of clubs that participated in higher divisions. In the summer of 1993 he moved to Paniliakos; he stayed there for three years, scoring 26 goals in 84 games and establishing himself as a member of the national U21 team.

Olympiacos
Having attracted the attention of the top clubs, in the summer of 1996 Stelios signed for Olympiacos F.C. at the age of 21. One of Stelios' career highlights came in only his second season with the club when he prestigiously scored Olympiacos' first ever Champions League goal against Porto. The stunning 40-meter lob was voted as the goal of the competition by fans and also led to Olympiacos' first ever win in the competition. Olympiacos won the Greek championship in every single season while Stelios was with them and reached the quarter finals of the Champions League during the 1998–99 season. His reputation as a player was cemented in his last and most successful season with the club when he scored 15 goals, including 2 goals in the title deciding 3–0 win over arch rivals Panathinaikos in May 2003. Stelios spent a total of seven successful seasons there as a regular player, making a total of 189 appearances and scoring 63 goals in all competitions. To this day Giannakopoulos regularly attends special events at his former club and is considered a legend by the fans, notably for the determination he put into every match including the derbies against arch-rivals Panathinaikos and AEK Athens where he scored many of his finest goals.

Bolton Wanderers
However, on 28 May 2003, after ten years of professional football in Greece he was snapped up by English Premier League side Bolton Wanderers. The manager at the time Sam Allardyce described Stelios as "...an attacking midfielder who knows how to score goals. His main attribute remains his ability to make late runs into the penalty area and his flair to shoot accurately from range." It was at this point that the popular name 'Stelios' came about as the player unconventionally chose for his first name to be printed on his shirt instead of his very long (and difficult for the English journalists) surname. He made his Bolton début against Manchester United and helped Bolton reach the 2004 Football League Cup Final and their highest ever Premier League finish in his first season. Stelios' first two seasons with the club were successful, demonstrated by the fact that both Manchester City and Liverpool openly attempted to sign him before he signed a new contract with Bolton in August 2005.

His fine form continued into the 2005–06 season which was Stelios' most successful as he was top scorer for Bolton with 12 goals, an impressive tally for a midfielder. One of the highlights of that season was the winning goal he scored against Arsenal in an FA Cup Fourth round match played at the Reebok Stadium on 28 January 2006.  His form dipped slightly in the 2006–07 season where he missed several games through injury and failed to score any goals although he was still a regular player for the club with 28 games.

On 17 March 2006, he was chosen to play in a 50th anniversary game for the pact of Rome and for the participation of Manchester United in UEFA competitions, in a match that took place in Old Trafford. Giannakopoulos played in the second half alongside players such as Steven Gerrard, Robbie Fowler, Andrea Pirlo, Zlatan Ibrahimovic, Henrik Larsson, Gennaro Gattuso and others against Manchester United in a 4–3 loss.

With Sam Allardyce leaving the club at the start of the 2007–08 season and only a year left on his contract, there were rumours of Stelios moving to another Premier League club or returning to Greece. However Stelios stayed at Bolton and although he was not as regular a player as previous seasons (due to injury and managerial changes) he was able to help Bolton with a string of late goals. The first one during injury time in the League Cup third round tie against Fulham at Craven Cottage, the second one in the UEFA Cup, when Stelios scored in the third minute of injury time to salvage a 1–1 draw against Aris Salonica and the third one in a Premier League game versus Derby when Stelios again scored in injury time to earn Bolton a much needed three points in what was a poor season for the team. His last ever goal for Bolton was a crucial one and came on 26 April 2008 when he scored in the 1–1 draw against Tottenham Hotspur helping Bolton avoid relegation.

At the end of the season Stelios was not offered a new contract and was released by the club fuelling speculation that he would be returning to his native Greece and finishing off his career at Olympiacos. However the player confirmed that he would prefer to stay in the Premier League, and was subsequently linked with a move to newly promoted Premier League club Hull City, after interest from their new manager Phil Brown who worked with Stelios at Bolton.

Hull City
On 22 September 2008 it was confirmed by Hull that they had signed Stelios on a one-year deal. Stelios is another player who arrived at Hull City with an impressive track record, having spent 5 years in the Premier League with Bolton and winning Euro 2004 with Greece. He joined the Tigers in 2008, for the club's first ever season in the top flight under Phil Brown.

He made his debut for Hull against Portsmouth exactly 2 months after joining them on 22 November 2008, coming on as a sub in the 82nd minute. Stelios would make one more substitute appearance in the league as well as a full game in the FA cup before he decided to make a further move having been frustrated by his lack of games at Hull.

AEL
On 22 January 2009, six years after his first move to the UK, Stelios returned to Greece by signing for Greek side AEL on a one-and-a-half-year deal. Stelios' impact was instant as the Greek press labeled him the 'most important transfer of the winter period' as he scored three crucial goals in his first four games to propel Larissa to a top 5 position in the Greek Super League. Larissa were able to maintain this position until the end of the season which qualified them for European competition, something which Stelios admitted was a great achievement and totally unexpected for a smaller team like Larissa and compared it to his time with Bolton. The following season however was not as successful as Stelios struggled with injuries and even courted controversy with some comments he made to the Greek press that were seen as being disloyal to his team. He parted company amicably with Larissa on 12 December 2009, six months before his contract would have officially ended.

International career
Stelios made his international debut on 12 March 1997 in a friendly game against Cyprus. His first international goal came almost two years later on 5 February 1999 in a friendly game against Belgium. He fell out of favour slightly in 2000 and 2001 featuring in only three games in two years however cemented his place in the team from 2002 onwards, featuring in every single game of the EURO 2004 qualifiers. One of his most important and memorable goals with the Greece national football team was during those qualifiers; Stelios scoring the only goal in a 1–0 away victory against Spain in Zaragoza, in a game which ensured automatic qualification for Greece. He was also one of the key players in the victorious team at the 2004 European Football Championship playing in four out of six games including the final. Following this success, Giannakopoulos would remain a key part of the national team, becoming Greece's top scorer in their failed 2006 FIFA World Cup qualifying campaign. He was also amongst the squad that unsuccessfully defended their title at the Euro 2008 competition. His last game for the national team came during that competition, in the 2–1 defeat against Spain on 18 June 2008. Stelios had scored a total of 12 goals for the national team; an interesting statistic being that Greece had won all but one of the games in which Stelios had scored in.

Managerial career and life after football
On 25 May 2010, Stelios was voted as president of the Greek Professional Footballers Association, taking over from his former teammate Antonios Nikopolidis.
He started his managerial career on 13 August 2012 after taking charge of his old team Paniliakos F.C. in Football League 2 (Greece). Paniliakos fired Stelios on 20 January 2013. Other managerial stints followed including a short spell with A.E._Kifisia_F.C. in 2016 and assisting the national team manager Angelos Anastasiadis during his position as the Greece national team coach in 2018–19.

There were some widespread but short-lived talk in 2015 that Stelios was heading a consortium to take over the financially troubled Bolton Wanderers but this did not materialise.

Stelios has been a vocal critic of how football is run in Greece, in March 2015 he said in an interview with BBC Sport that he feared continued violence at games threatened the future of the sport in his country. The Greek government had suspended professional football play three times that season because of violence at matches. "Football people like myself, we are little bit concerned about football in Greece in the future," said Stelios. He also added: "We need support from UEFA, from [world players' union] FIFPro and of course we need support from the Greek government, which is completely new. All these [should] sit down together at the same table and take some decisions."

Personal life
Stelios' second born son, Dimitris, is also a footballer and as of 2022 plays for the Bolton Wanderers Academy.

Career statistics

Club

International goals
Scores and results list Greece's goal tally first, score column indicates score after each Giannakopoulos goal.

Honours
Paniliakos
 Beta Ethniki: 1994–95

Olympiacos
 Super League Greece: 1996–97, 1997–98, 1998–99, 1999–2000, 2000–01, 2001–02, 2002–03
 Greek Cup: 1998–99; runner-up 2000–01, 2001–02

Bolton Wanderers
 Football League Cup runners-up: 2003–04

Greece
 UEFA Euro: 2004

Individual
 Greek Footballer of the Year: 2003
 Greek Second Division best player: 1995

References

External links
 

1974 births
Living people
Footballers from Athens
Greek footballers
Association football wingers
Association football forwards
Greece international footballers
Ethnikos Asteras F.C. players
Paniliakos F.C. players
Athlitiki Enosi Larissa F.C. players
Olympiacos F.C. players
Bolton Wanderers F.C. players
Hull City A.F.C. players
Premier League players
UEFA Euro 2004 players
UEFA European Championship-winning players
2005 FIFA Confederations Cup players
UEFA Euro 2008 players
Super League Greece players
Football League (Greece) players
Greek expatriate footballers
Expatriate footballers in England
Greek expatriate sportspeople in England
A.E. Kifisia F.C.
Doxa Vyronas F.C. players